Pedro Mercado was a Mexican fencer. He competed in the individual épée event at the 1928 Summer Olympics.

References

External links
 

Year of birth missing
Possibly living people
Mexican male épée fencers
Olympic fencers of Mexico
Fencers at the 1928 Summer Olympics